John Hart Dunne K.C.B. (1835–1924) was a British soldier of Irish descent, who served in several major campaigns of the nineteenth century.

John Hart Dunne was born in Cartrun, County Roscommon, Ireland, in 1835.

In 1852, Dunne was commissioned into the 62nd Regiment of the British Army. Two years later he was transferred to the 21st Regiment. He served in the Crimean War where he saw action at the battles of Alma, Balaclava and Inkerman and at the Siege of Sevastopol.

In 1855 he was promoted to Captain and served in the 99th Regiment of Foot in India. It was with this unit that he participated in the notorious Second Opium War with China in 1860. As part of the plunder gained during the ransacking of the Summer Palace, five lapdogs were seized. In April 1861, Captain Dunne gifted one of these dogs, Looty, to Queen Victoria for the Royal Collection of dogs. Dunne thus became credited with the introduction of Pekinese dogs into Britain. A picture of Looty was painted for the Queen by Friedrich Wilhelm Keyl. Dunne also received a replica of the picture.

Further promotion followed; In 1865 Lieutenant-Colonel, 1881 Major-General, 1889 Lieutenant-General, and 1893 General. Final appointments included; 1894 Lieutenancy of the Tower of London and 1898 Colonel of the Duke of Edinburgh’s Wiltshire Regiment.

His eldest son was the aeronautical engineer, philosopher and fly-fisherman, John William Dunne (1875-1949).

General Sir John Hart Dunne, K.C.B. died on April 20, 1924, and is buried in Sidmouth, Devon.

In 2020, a lot of "interesting items" relating to Dunne, including photographs of both him and Looty the dog, were sold at Chorley's for £3,800.

Works
 Dunne, John Hart. 1861. From Calcutta to Pekin, being notes taken from the journal of an officer between those places. London: S. Low, Son and Co.

Arms

References

1835 births
1924 deaths